Anup Wadhawan is the Commerce Secretary for the Government of India.

An IAS officer of the 1985 batch of the Uttarakhand cadre, Wadhawan received a bachelor's degree from University of Delhi and followed it up with a postgraduate degree from Delhi School of Economics. He earned a PhD from Duke University. Wadhawan has served both central in various roles at Department of Commerce, Directorate General of Foreign Trade, Department of Financial Services, Department of Economic Affairs, and Prime Minister's Office (India).

References

Indian government officials

Delhi University alumni
Delhi School of Economics alumni
Duke University alumni
Living people
Year of birth missing (living people)
Uttarakhand cadre civil servants